Tullparaju (possibly from Quechua tullpa rustic cooking-fire, stove, rahu snow, ice, mountain with snow) is a mountain in the Cordillera Blanca in the Andes of Peru, about  high. It is situated in the Ancash Region, Huaraz Province, Independencia District, and in the Huari Province, Huari District. Tullparaju lies southeast of the mountains Pucaranra and Chinchey and northeast of Andavite. It is situated at the end of the Quilcayhuanca valley, northeast of the lake Tullpacocha.

Sources 

Mountains of Peru
Mountains of Ancash Region